John "Jack" Francis Gunion (born 21 July 1943 in Washington, DC) is an American physicist, specializing in theoretical high energy physics.

Gunion received in 1965 his bachelor's degree from Cornell University and in 1970 his Ph.D. from the University of California, San Diego. As a postdoc he was from 1970 to 1972 at SLAC and from 1972 to 1973 at the Massachusetts Institute of Technology. From 1973 to 1975 he was an assistant professor at the University of Pittsburgh. In 1978 he moved to the University of California, Davis and remained there, retiring in 2017 as professor emeritus.

He led the High Energy Physics Theory Group of the United States Department of Energy and was one of the initiators of the High Energy Frontier Theory Initiative (HEFTI).

He coauthored, with three collaborators, an important monograph on the physics of the Higgs boson. He is the author or coauthor of hundreds of scientific articles and has an h-index of 100. He is currently working on Higgs physics beyond the Standard Model and supersymmetry with a focus on future collider detections of such physics.

From 1974 to 1978 he was a Sloan Fellow and in 1989 he was elected a Fellow of the American Physical Society. In 2000 he was Schrödinger Professor at the Schrödinger Institute of the University of Vienna. He is a member of the American Association for the Advancement of Science. In 2017 he, together with three collaborators, received the Sakurai Prize for "instrumental contributions to the theory of the properties, reactions, and signatures of the Higgs boson".

Selected publications
 with Howard Haber, Gordon L. Kane, and Sally Dawson: The Higgs Hunter's Guide, Addison Wesley 1990, Westview Press 2000, CRC Press 2018

References

External links
 Homepage

20th-century American physicists
21st-century American physicists
Cornell University alumni
University of California, San Diego alumni
University of California, Davis faculty
Fellows of the American Physical Society
J. J. Sakurai Prize for Theoretical Particle Physics recipients
1943 births
Living people